Pedro "Pepé" Correia Alves (born 17 September 1999) is an Angolan footballer who currently plays as a defender for Progresso Sambizanga.

Career statistics

Club

Notes

International

References

1999 births
Living people
Angolan footballers
Angola international footballers
Association football defenders
Progresso Associação do Sambizanga players
C.D. Primeiro de Agosto players
Girabola players
Angola under-20 international footballers